Fernando Illescas Mariñelarena (born 1 June 1999) is a Mexican professional footballer who plays as an attacking midfielder for Liga MX club Mazatlán.

Career statistics

Club

References

External links
 
 
 

Living people
1999 births
Mexican footballers
Association football midfielders
Club Celaya footballers
Club Necaxa footballers
Liga de Expansión MX players
Liga MX players
Mazatlán F.C. footballers
Footballers from Chihuahua
People from Chihuahua City